Wallace is a Scottish surname stemmed from the Anglo-Norman French  "Welshman". It is a northern variant form of  "Welshman" (Wace, Brut, éd. I. Arnold, 13927); adjectiv  "Welsh" (Id., ibid., 14745); same as  "the oil language" (J. Bretel, Tournoi de Chauvency, éd. M. Delbouille, 63).

It originates from Old Low Franconian *Walhisk meaning "foreigner", "Celt", "Roman" which is a cognate of Old English wylisċ (pronounced "wullish") meaning "foreigner" or "Welshman" (see also  Wallach and Walhaz). The original surname may have denoted someone from the former Kingdom of Strathclyde who spoke Cumbric, a close relative of the Welsh language, or possibly an incomer from Wales, or the Welsh Marches. The Kingdom of Strathclyde was originally a part of the Hen Ogledd, its people speaking a Brythonic language distinct from Scottish Gaelic and the Scots language derived from Lothian.

Variations of the name include Walla, Wallais, Wallice, Wallang, Wallass, Wallayis, Wallays, Walleis, Wallensis, Walles, Valance, Valensis, Valeyns, Vallace, Vallance, and Valles.

In modern times, in the 19th and 20th centuries, the surname has been used as an Americanization of numerous Ashkenazic Jewish surnames.

Notable people

Academia
Alexander Doniphan Wallace (1905–1985) American mathematician
Alfred Russel Wallace (1823–1913), British naturalist and biologist
Andrew H. Wallace (1926–2008), Scottish-American mathematician
Bruce Wallace (geneticist)
Carden Wallace, Australian marine biologist
Catherine C. "Cath" Wallace (born 1952), New Zealand environmentalist and academic
Chris Wallace (computer scientist) (1933–2004), Australian computer scientist and physicist, developer of Minimum Message Length
David R. Wallace (1942–2012), American software engineer and inventor
David Rains Wallace (born 1945), author on conservation and natural history
David Wallace (physicist) (born 1945), British physicist and Master of Churchill College, Cambridge
David Wallace (medievalist), British scholar of medieval literature
Dorothy Wallace, American mathematician
Douglas C. Wallace (born 1946), American geneticist and evolutionary biologist
Frank R. Wallace (1932–2006), author and philosopher
Ian Wallace (ornithologist) (1933–2021), British ornithologist and natural history author
John Higgins Wallace Jr. (1906–1989), American chemist
John L. Wallace (born 1956), Canadian medical scientist
J. M. Wallace-Hadrill (1916–1985), British academic and historian
John Michael Wallace (born 1940), American atmospheric scientist
Mike Wallace (historian) (born 1942), American historian
Perry Wallace (1948–2017), American law professor and first African American athlete to play a complete college career in the Southeastern Conference
Raymond L. Wallace (1918–2002), American Bigfoot researcher
Richard Wallace (scientist), artificial intelligence researcher
Robert Charles Wallace (1881–1955), Scottish-born Canadian geologist, educator, and administrator
William Wallace (philosopher) (1844–1897), Scottish philosopher
William Wallace (mathematician) (1768–1843), Scottish mathematician
William Wallace, Baron Wallace of Saltaire (born 1941), British academic, writer and politician
William A. Wallace (organizational theorist) (born 1935), Professor at Rensselaer Polytechnic Institute
William E. Wallace (1917–2004), physical chemist

Armed forces
Christopher Wallace (British Army officer) (born 1943), retired British Army general and trustee of the Imperial War Museum
Colin Wallace (born 1943), British soldier and psychological warfare operative
George W. Wallace (1872–1946), American soldier
Herman C. Wallace (1924–1945), American soldier
James Wallace (Royal Navy officer) (1731–1803), Royal Navy officer
Lew Wallace (1827–1905), American Civil War general and author
Martin Wallace (soldier) (born 1969), Australian SASR soldier
Martin R. M. Wallace (1829–1902), American Union brevet brigadier general
Robert Wallace (British Army officer) (1860–1929), Irish lawyer, soldier and politician
Samuel Thomas Dickson Wallace (1892–1968), Scottish soldier
W. H. L. Wallace (1821–1862), Union general in the American Civil War
William Wallace (died 1305), Scottish landowner, one of the main leaders during the wars of Scottish Independence
William Henry Wallace (1827–1901), Confederate general and South Carolina state legislator
William Miller Wallace (1844–1924), U.S. Army general

Law
John Wallace (New Zealand judge) (1934–2012), chairman of the Royal Commission on the Electoral System, 1986
John Clifford Wallace (born 1928), United States federal judge
John E. Wallace Jr. (born 1942), former New Jersey Supreme Court justice
John William Wallace (1815–1884), American lawyer
Michael Wallace (lawyer) (born 1951), U.S. lawyer
William James Wallace (1837–1917), lawyer and federal judge in the United States
William Robert Wallace (1886–1960), American judge
William T. Wallace (1828–1909), Chief Justice of the Supreme Court of California and an Attorney General of California

Media (actors, artists, writers, journalists)
Andree Wallace, American actress
Andy Wallace (producer) (born 1947), American music studio engineer
Anne Wallace (born 1970), Australian painter
Barbara Brooks Wallace (1922-2018), American children's writer
Benjamin Wallace (writer), American author and magazine writer
Beryl Wallace (1912-1948), American singer, dancer, and actress
Bill Wallace (author) (1947–2012), American author 
Bronwen Wallace (1945–1989), Canadian poet and short story writer
Chris Wallace (born 1947), American newscaster at ABC, NBC, and Fox News
Chris Wallace-Crabbe (born 1934), Australian poet
Christine Wallace (born 1960), Australian journalist and author
Claire Wallace (broadcaster) (1900 or 1906–1968), Canadian journalist and broadcaster
Daniel Wallace (author) (born 1959), American author
Danny Wallace (humourist) (born 1976), British comedian, author and presenter
David Wallace (American actor) (born 1958), American actor
David Foster Wallace (1962–2008), American novelist
Dee Wallace (born 1948), American actress
DeWitt Wallace (1889–1981), American co-founder of Reader's Digest magazine
Donald Mackenzie Wallace (1841–1919), British public servant, journalist and author
Dougie Wallace, Scots photographer
Edgar Wallace (1875–1932), British crime writer
George Wallace (American comedian) (born 1952), American comedian
Ginger Wallace (1924–2010), American artist 
Ian Wallace (author) (1912–1998), American science fiction author
Ian Wallace (artist) (born 1943), pioneer of Vancouver's conceptual art movement
Ian Wallace (illustrator), Canadia illustrator of children's books
Ian Wallace (photographer) (born 1972), Tasmanian landscape photographer
Irving Wallace (1916–1990), American author and screenwriter
Jean Wallace (1923–1990), American actress
Jessie Wallace (born 1971), English actress
John Graham Wallace (born 1966), English author of children's books
Kathleen Kemarre Wallace (born 1948), Australian Aboriginal artist
Kathryn Ann Wallace (born 1975), American television and film journalist
Kevin Wallace (born 1957), Irish theatrical producer
Lila Bell Wallace (1889–1984), American co-founder of Reader's Digest magazine
Louise Wallace (born 1959), New Zealand television presenter, actress and director
Louise Wallace (writer) (born 1983), New Zealand poet
Marcia Wallace (1942–2013), American actress
Marjorie Wallace (born 1954), American model, actress and presenter
Mike Wallace (1918–2012), American television correspondent
Morgan Wallace (1881-1953), American actor
Naomi Wallace (born 1960), American playwright, screenwriter and poet
Nick Wallace (born 1972), British author
Nicolle Wallace (born 1972), American television host, author, and former political figure
Randall Wallace (born 1949), American writer and film director
Richard Wallace (director) (1894–1951), American film director
Richard Wallace (journalist) (born 1961), British newspaper editor
Rowena Wallace (born 1947), English-born Australian actress
Tommy Lee Wallace (born 1949), American film producer, director and screenwriter
William O. Wallace (1906-1968), American Hollywood set decorator
William Ross Wallace (1819–1881), American poet

Musicians
Aria Wallace (born 1996), American actress and singer
Beryl Wallace (1912–1948), American singer, dancer and actress
Bill Wallace (musician) (born 1949), Canadian rock-and-roll musician
Chris Wallace (musician) (born 1985), lead vocalist for The White Tie Affair
 Christopher George Latore Wallace (1972–1997), aka The Notorious B.I.G., American rap artist
Emmett "Babe" Wallace (1909–2006), American composer, singer, actor
Frank Wallace (piper), Irish musician
Ian Wallace (drummer) (1946–2007), drummer with King Crimson, Bob Dylan, and many others
Ian Wallace (singer) (1919–2009), singer and contestant on My Music
Jerry Wallace (1928–2008), American country and pop singer
John Wallace (musician) (fl. 1971– present), American bassist and singer
John Bruce Wallace, American musician and artist
Michael Wallace (piper) (fl. late 1800s), Irish musician
Simon Wallace (born 1957), British composer and pianist
Sippie Wallace (1898–1986), American singer-songwriter
Stewart Wallace (born 1960), American composer
 Terry Wallace Jr. (born 1994), aka Tee Grizzley, American rapper
Wesley Wallace dates unknown), American blues and boogie-woogie pianist
William Wallace (Scottish composer) (1860–1940), Scottish composer
William Vincent Wallace (1812–1865), Irish composer

Politics and business
Ben Wallace (politician) (born 1970), British Conservative politician 
Bob Wallace (computer scientist) (1949–2002), American software developer & programmer
Carleton Lyman Wallace (1866-1919), American lawyer and Minnesota state legislator
Dan Wallace (politician) (born 1942), Irish Fianna Fáil politician
David Wallace (Indiana politician) (1799–1859), 6th Governor of Indiana
David G. Wallace, American businessman and politician, mayor of Sugar Land, Texas
David Wardrope Wallace (1850–1924), Canadian MP for Russell, 1903–1904
Elizabeth Virginia Wallace (1885–1982), birth name of Bess Truman, wife of U.S. President Harry S. Truman
Euan Wallace (1892–1941), British Conservative politician
G. Frank Wallace (1887–1964), New York state senator
Georg Wallace (1804-1890), Norwegian politician.
George Wallace (1919–1998), 45th Governor of Alabama
George Wallace Jr. (born 1951), American politician
Henry A. Wallace (1888–1965), 33rd Vice President of the United States
Henry Cantwell Wallace (1866–1924), American farmer, journalist and political activist
I. T. A. Wallace-Johnson (1894–1965), Sierra Leonean journalist, activist and politician
Jim Wallace, Baron Wallace of Tankerness (born 1954), British politician and former Deputy First Minister of Scotland
John Wallace (Australian politician) (1828–1901), Australian politician
John Wallace (Canadian politician) (1812–1896), New Brunswick farmer and member of the Canadian House of Commons
John Wallace (English politician) (1840-1910), English politician
John Wallace (Florida politician) (1842–1908), Florida Republican politician
John Wallace (Scottish politician) (1868–1949), Member of Parliament for Dumfermline Burghs
John Alexander Wallace (1881–1961), Canadian politician
John D. Wallace (born 1949), Canadian politician
John Winfield Wallace (1818–1889), US Congressman from Pennsylvania
Jonathan H. Wallace (1824–1892), United States Congressman
Lurleen Wallace (1926–1968), 46th Governor of Alabama
Marjorie Wallace (SANE) (born 1945), British writer, broadcaster, investigative journalist, charity executive
Mark Wallace (born 1967), American businessman, former diplomat, and lawyer
Martin Kelso Wallace (1898–1978), Irish Lord Mayor of Belfast
Mary Wallace (born 1959), Irish Fianna Fáil politician
Maynard Wallace (1943-2021), American politician
Michael Wallace (politician) (died 1831), Scottish-born merchant, judge and political figure in Nova Scotia
Mick Wallace (born 1955), Irish politician, football manager and property developer
Mike Wallace (politician) (born 1963), Canadian politician
Peggy Wallace (1943-2020), American politician
Robert Wallace (Canadian politician) (1820–?), Canadian Member of Parliament
Robert Wallace (Edinburgh MP) (1831–1899), British Member of Parliament for Edinburgh East, 1886–1899
Robert Wallace (MP for Greenock) (1773–1855), Scottish politician, MP for Greenock, 1832–1845
Robert Wallace (MP for Perth) (1850–1939), Irish-born politician, MP for Perth, 1895–1907
Robert B. Wallace (–1928), American politician
Robert M. Wallace (1856–1942), United States Representative from Arkansas
William Wallace (Canadian politician) (1820–1887), Scottish-born merchant and politician in Ontario
William A. Wallace (1827–1896), U.S. Senator from Pennsylvania
William C. Wallace (1856–1901), U.S. Representative from New York
William H. Wallace (1811–1879), first territorial governor and Congressional delegate from Idaho Territory
William J. Wallace (Indianapolis mayor), 7th Mayor of Indianapolis, Indiana

Religion
Duncan Wallace (1938-2015), Canadian Anglican Bishop of Qu'Appelle
Foy E. Wallace (1896–1979), American Churches of Christ minister
John Wallace (bishop) (1654–1733), Scottish Roman Catholic prelate
Martin Wallace (bishop) (born 1948), English Anglican Bishop of Selby
Robert Wallace (minister) (1697–1771), minister of the Church of Scotland and writer on population
Robert Wallace (Unitarian) (1791–1850), English Unitarian minister
William Wallace (Jesuit) (1863–1922), Irish Jesuit and Indologist

Sport
A. J. Wallace (American football) (born 1988), American football player
Alexander Wallace (footballer) (1874 – 1899), English footballer
Andy Wallace (racing driver) (born 1961), British race car driver
Ben Wallace (born 1974), American basketball player
Bill Wallace (American football) (1912–1993), American football player
Bill Wallace (martial artist) (born 1945), American karateka and kickboxer
Billy Wallace (1878–1972), New Zealand rugby union player
B. J. Wallace (born 1971), former American Minor League Baseball pitcher
Bo Wallace (born 1992), American football player
Bob Wallace (American football) (born 1945), former American football player
Bob Wallace (footballer born 1948), English footballer
Bob Wallace (footballer born 1893) (1893–1970), Scottish footballer for Nottingham Forest
Bob Wallace (test driver) (1938–2013), New Zealand racing driver, auto engineer, developer of Lamborghini
Bobby Wallace (American football) (born 1954), American college football coach
Bobby Wallace (baseball) (1873–1960), American baseball player
Chris Wallace (American football) (born 1975), American football quarterback
Chris Wallace (basketball), American basketball executive, scout, and manager
Chrissy Wallace (born 1988), American race car driver
Darrell Wallace Jr. (born 1993), American stock car driver
Dave Wallace (baseball) (born 1947), American baseball coach and player
David Wallace (catcher) (born 1979), American professional baseball player
David Wallace (footballer), New Zealand international soccer player
David Wallace (rugby union) (born 1976), Irish rugby union player
Derek Wallace (born 1971), American baseball player
Doc Wallace (1893–1964), American baseball player
Don Wallace (born 1940), American baseball player
Frank Wallace (soccer) (1922–1979), American soccer player, nicknamed "Pee Wee"
Gerald Wallace (born 1982), American basketball player
Harold Wallace (born 1975), Costa Rican soccer player
Heather Wallace (born 1961), Canadian squash player 
Huck Wallace (1882–1951), American baseball player
Ian Wallace (footballer) (born 1956), Scottish international footballer
Isabelle Wallace (born 1996), Australian tennis player
Jack Wallace (American football) (c. 1925–1995), American football player and coach
Jack Wallace (catcher) (1890–1960), American baseball player
Jackie Wallace (born 1951), American football player
Jarrod Wallace (born 1991), Australian Rugby League player
Jilly Wallace (born 1964), British freestyle skier and mother of Lloyd
Jock Wallace Jr. (1935–1996), Scottish football player and manager
John Wallace (American football coach), college football coach, head football coach at Rutgers University
John Wallace (basketball) (born 1974), American basketball player
John Wallace (cricketer) (born 1924), South African-born first-class cricketer, who played for Rhodesia
John Wallace (rower) (born 1962), Canadian rower
John Wallace (sailor) (1903–1990), American sailor
Jonathan Wallace (born 1986), American basketball player
Joe Wallace (footballer) (1933–1993), Scottish footballer
Keith Wallace (boxer) (1961–2000), English professional and Olympic boxer
Ken Wallace (canoeist) (born 1983), Australian sprint canoer
Ken Wallace (cricketer) (born 1936), English cricketer
Kenny Wallace (born 1963), American stock car driver, former TV commentator
K'Von Wallace (born 1997), American football player
Lee Wallace (born 1987), Scottish football player
Levi Wallace (born 1995), American football player
Lloyd Wallace (born 1995), British freestyle skier and son of Jilly
Mark Wallace (cricketer) (born 1981), Welsh cricketer
Matt Wallace (racing driver) (born 1995), American race car driver
Merv Wallace (1916–2008), New Zealand cricketer
Mike Wallace (American football) (born 1986), American football wide receiver
Mike Wallace (baseball) (born 1951), American baseball player
Mike Wallace (racing driver) (born 1959), American race car driver
Nancy Wallace (Pearson), American curler
Peter Wallace (born 1985), Australian Rugby League player
Peter Wallace (born 2002), Dedicated Weezer fan
Philo Wallace (born 1970), Barbadian cricketer
Raphael Wallace (born 1957), Nevisian cricketer
Rasheed Wallace (born 1974), American basketball player
Robin Wallace, British freestyle skier
Rod Wallace (born 1969), English football player
Ross Wallace (born 1985), Scottish football player
Rusty Wallace (born 1956), American NASCAR driver
Seneca Wallace (born 1980), American football player
Steve Wallace (American football) (born 1964), American football player
Steve Wallace (NASCAR) (born 1987), American race car driver
Terry Wallace (born 1958), Australian football player and coach
Tylan Wallace (born 1999), American football player
William Wallace (rower) (born 1904), Canadian Olympic rower
William Middleton Wallace (died 1915), Scotland rugby player
Willie Wallace (born 1940), Scottish footballer

Fiction
Barret Wallace, fictional character in Final Fantasy VII
Beth Wallace, fictional character in the soap opera Passions
Chris Wallace (EastEnders), an EastEnders character
David Wallace, CEO of Dunder Mifflin on the US TV series The Office
Eli Wallace, fictional character on the TV science fiction drama series Stargate Universe
Marsellus Wallace, fictional gangster portrayed by Ving Rhames in the 1994 film Pulp Fiction
Nathan Wallace, fictional character in Repo! The Genetic Opera
Nicole Wallace, fictional character on the TV drama series Law & Order: Criminal Intent
Shilo Wallace, fictional character in Repo! The Genetic Opera
 Wallace Wallace, fictional character in No More Dead Dogs who was always on detention.

Other
Benjamin Wallace (circus owner) (1847–1921), American circus owner
David A. Wallace (1917–2004), American urban planner, architect, and educator
Frank Wallace (gangster) (before 1910–1931), Irish-American gangster from South Boston
John Findley Wallace (1852–1921), American engineer, worked on the Panama Canal
John-Paul Wallace (born 1976), English chess player
Keith Wallace (wine writer), wine columnist, journalist and wine school founder
Martin Wallace (game designer), English game designer
Michele Wallace (born 1952), African American feminist and author
Minik Wallace (c. 1890–1918), Greenland-born Inuk brought to America for study
Sir Richard Wallace, 1st Baronet (1818–1890), English art collector
Richetta Randolph Wallace (1884-1971), American administrator and campaigner
Sanford Wallace (born 1968), American spammer and DJ, self-proclaimed "Spam King"
Staker Wallace (1733–1798), United Irishman who rebelled against the British
William Wallace (c. 1270-1305), Scottish leader in the 1st Wars of Scottish Independence
William Wallace (mason) (died 1631), Scottish master mason and architect
William A. A. Wallace (1817–1899), American Texas Ranger captain with the nickname "Bigfoot"
William Herbert Wallace (1878–1933), English convicted 'murderer', later found to be innocent on appeal
William Kelly Wallace (1883–1969), Irish railway engineer
William Wallace Lincoln (1850–1862), son of Abraham Lincoln
Peter Wallace (buccaneer) (fl. 1630s), Anglo-Scottish buccaneer in the Bay of Honduras

See also
Clan Wallace
Wallace (given name)
Wallace (disambiguation)
Wallis (surname)

References

Scottish surnames
Surnames of Lowland Scottish origin
English-language surnames
Ethnonymic surnames
fr:Wallace
id:Wallace
nl:Wallace
ja:ウォレス
pl:Wallace
zh:华莱士